Ottistirini is a weevil tribe in the subfamily Entiminae.

Genera 
Atrotitis – Ecezius – Eutinophaea – Ittostira – Leacis – Maleuterpes – Nesogenocis – Ottinychus – Ottistira – Szygops – Tistortia – Tistortiella

References 

 Alonso-Zarazaga, M.A.; Lyal, C.H.C. 1999: A world catalogue of families and genera of Curculionoidea (Insecta: Coleoptera) (excepting Scolytidae and Platypodidae). Entomopraxis, Barcelona.
 Heller, K.M. 1925: Bestimmungsschlüssel aussereuropäischer Käfer. Curculionidae, Tribus n.: Ottistirini. Wiener Entomologische Zeitung, 42(4-10): 55-91 + pl. I.
 Kuschel, G. 2008: Curculionoidea (weevils) of New Caledonia and Vanuatu: ancestral families and some Curculionidae. In: Grandcolas, P. (ed.), Zoologia Neocaledonica 6. Biodiversity studies in New Caledonia. Mémoires du Muséum national d'Histoire naturelle, 197: 99-250.  
 Oberprieler, R.G. 2010: A reclassification of the weevil subfamily Cyclominae (Coleoptera: Curculionidae). Zootaxa, 2515: 1–35.
 Zimmerman, E.C. 1939: Revision of the Fijian Ottistirini (Coleoptera, Curculionidae). Occasional papers of the Bernice P. Bishop Museum, 14: 301–312.

External links 

Entiminae
Beetle tribes